Six Candles for Indonesia was a published fictional diary by .

The diary consists of six chapters, symbolically called "candles".  The book was released by the underground magazine Ons volk (Our people) during the Second World War. It was commissioned by and written for the Australian Overseas Information Committee.

Dutch literature
Dutch East Indies
De Bezige Bij books